As of June 23, 2011, 749 foreign private contractor deaths in Iraq as part of the Iraq War are listed in this article. Of those, 355 were Americans, at least were 130 Turks and 58 were Britons. 225 of those killed were private military contractors or PMC's.

The U.S. Department of Labor confirmed that by the end of March 2009, 917 civilian contractors were killed in Iraq, of which 224 (23 percent) were U.S. citizens. This number was updated to 1,537, by the end of March 2011, with an estimated 354 of these being U.S. citizens. The total number of dead was further updated to 1,569, by July 20, 2012.

Incidents

2003 
 April 10, 2003 – American, Robert Grimm, was killed in a vehicle accident on the Kuwait-Iraq border. He was working for National Response Corp. of Long Island as a fireman.
 July 10, 2003 – American, name unknown, was killed in a vehicle accident near Basra. He was working for Kellogg, Brown & Root as a truck driver.
 July 21, 2003 – Briton, Peter Rudolf, drowned when he fell ill while on a dive near Umm Qasr. He was working for Sub-Surface Eng'g as a diver.
 August 5, 2003 – American, Fred Bryant Jr., was killed by a roadside bomb near Tikrit. He was working for Kellogg, Brown & Root as a truck driver.
 August 10, 2003 – Nepali, name unknown, was killed by a riot in Basra. He was working as a PMC.
 August 19, 2003 – American, Nadan Audisho Younadam, was killed in an ambush in Tikrit. He was working for the U.S. Army as a translator.
 September 3, 2003 – American, Vernon Gaston, was killed in an ambush in Baghdad. He was working for Kellogg, Brown & Root as Operations Manager at the Joint Military Mail Terminal at Baghdad Airport.
 September 4, 2003 – Briton, Ian Rimell, was killed in an ambush near Mosul. He was working for Mines Advisory Group as a bomb disposal expert.
 September 12, 2003 – Jordanian, name unknown, was killed by friendly fire in Fallujah. He was working for a Jordanian hospital as a PMC.
 September 25, 2003 – Somali, name unknown, was killed by a bomb in Baghdad. He was working for a "al-Aike" hotel housing journalists from US television network NBC as a PMC
 October 9, 2003 – American, Kirk von Ackermann, was captured on a road between Kirkuk and Tikrit, he is still missing and presumed dead. He was working for IREX Services as a PMC. The CID determined that Von Ackermann died on October 9, 2003, in a botched kidnapping attempt. They still, however, refuse to give out information on his case which is still "active." Ackermann's body was never found.
 November 2, 2003 – Two Americans, Roy Buckmaster and David Dyess, were killed by a roadside bomb in Fallujah. They were working for EOD Technology, Inc. as bomb disposal experts.
 November 13, 2003 – American, Forrest Snare, was killed in an ambush west of Balad. He was working for IAP Worldwide Services as a private contractor.
 November 17, 2003 – American, Brent McJennett, was killed by a land mine in Tikrit. He was working for Proactive Communications Inc as a communications contractor. Hungarian, Péter Varga-Balázs, was killed by friendly fire near Ramadi. He was working for ToiFor Kft as a truck driver.
 November 23, 2003 – Two Americans, Todd Drobnick and Gordon Sinclair, were killed in a vehicle accident between Mosul and Dohuk. They were working for Titan National Security Solutions as translators.
 November 29, 2003 – Colombian, Jorge Arias Duque, was killed in an ambush in Balad. He was working for Kellogg, Brown & Root as a PMC.
 November 30, 2003 – Two South Koreans, Man-Soo Kim and Kyung-Hae Kwak, were killed in an ambush south of Tikrit. They were working for Omu Electric Co. as electricians.
 December 14, 2003 – American, Ryan Manelick, was killed in an ambush in Baghdad. He was working for IREX Services as a PMC.

2004 
 January 5, 2004 – Canadian, Richard Flynn, was killed by a roadside bomb. He was working as a PMC.
 January 6, 2004 – Two Frenchmen, names unknown, were killed in an ambush in Fallujah. They were working as private contractors.
 January 14, 2004 – Two Americans, names unknown, were killed in an ambush near Tikrit. They were working for Kellogg, Brown & Root as truck drivers.
 January 21, 2004 – American, Jody Deatherage, was killed in a vehicle accident. He was working for Kellogg, Brown & Root as a truck driver.
 January 24, 2004 – Pakistani, Habibur Rehman, was killed in an ambush. He was working for a Saudi Arabian firm as a truck driver.
 January 26, 2004 – American, Arthur Linderman Jr., was killed in an ambush near Tikrit. He was working for Kellogg, Brown & Root as a truck driver.
 January 29, 2004 – South African, Francois Strydom, was killed by a suicide bomber in Baghdad. He was working for SAS International as a PMC. Four other South African PMC were injured.
 February 8, 2004 – Fijian, Tomasi Ramatau, was killed in a mortar attack in Baghdad. He was working for Global Risk Strategies Limited as a PMC.
 February 16, 2004 – American, Ray Parks, was killed in an ambush in Baghdad. He was working for American Services Center as a private contractor.
 February 23, 2004 – American, Albert Luther Cayton, was killed by a roadside bomb. He was working for Kellogg, Brown & Root as a truck driver.
 February 29, 2004 – American, Travis B.Whitman, was killed in a vehicle accident in Baghdad. He was working as a PMC.
 March 16, 2004 – A Dutch and a German, names unknown, were killed in an ambush near Hillah. They were working as water project engineers.
 March 18, 2004 – Briton, Scott Mounce, was killed by a suicide bomber in Baghdad. He was working for an Italian communications company as a telecommunications engineer.
 March 22, 2004 – Two Finns, Seppo Haapanen and Jorma Toronen, were killed by a sniper west of Baghdad. They were both businessmen.
 March 28, 2004 – A Canadian and a Briton, Andy Bradsell and Christopher McDonald, were killed in an ambush in Mosul. They were working for Olive Security as PMC's.
 March 31, 2004 – Four Americans: Wesley Batalona, Scott Helvenston, Michael Teague and Jerko Zovko, were killed when they were ambushed and massacred in Fallujah, their bodies were mutilated and hanged for public display. They were working for Blackwater Security as PMC's.
 April 1, 2004 – Czech, Jiří Juran, was killed in an accidental gas explosion at a refinery in Baiji- Iraq. He was working for Chemoprojekt as a petrochemical expert.
 April 3, 2004 – American, Emad Mikha, was killed in an ambush in Muqdadiyah. He was working for Titan National Security Solutions as a translator.
 April 6, 2004 – South African, Gray Branfield, was killed during street fighting in Al Kut, his body was mutilated and hanged for public display. He was working for Hart Security Company as a PMC. Bulgarian, Mario Manchev, was killed in an ambush south of Nasiriyah. He was working for SOMAT as a truck driver.
 April 7, 2004 – Two Germans, Tobias Retterath and Thomas Hafenecker, were killed by Iraqi Terrorists in an ambush near Fallujah. They were members of the elite counter-terrorism unit GSG-9 working at the German embassy as guards. The second Officer; Thomas Hafenecker, is still missing today.
 April 8, 2004 – American, Tim Smith, was killed in an ambush. He was working for Kellogg, Brown & Root as a truck driver. Briton, Michael John Bloss, was killed in an ambush near Hit. He was working for Custer Battles as a PMC.
 April 9, 2004 – Seven Americans: William Bradley, Timothy Bell, Stephen Hulett, Steven Scott Fisher, Tony Duane Johnson, Jack Montague and Jeffery Parker, were killed when their convoy was ambushed and decimated in Baghdad. Bradley and Bell were initially classified as missing, Bradley's remains were recovered in 2005, while Bell is still missing and presumed dead. Another American, Thomas Hamill, was captured but he escaped the next month. They were working for Kellogg, Brown & Root as truck drivers. Two Nepalis, Ram Bahadur Gurung and Shiva Prasad Lawati, were killed by a land mine in northern Iraq. They were working for Global Risk Strategies Limited as PMC's.
 April 10, 2004 – American, Nick Berg, was captured in Baghdad and executed on May 7, his remains were recovered the next day. He was a businessman.
 April 11, 2004 – Dane, Henrik Frandsen, was shot and killed in Baghdad. He was a businessman. Romanian, Aron Alexandru, was killed in an ambush near Baghdad. He was working for Bidepa as a PMC.
 April 12, 2004 – South African, Hendrik Visagie, died at a U.S. military hospital from wounds received five days earlier in an ambush while escorting a convoy of diplomats from Jordan to Baghdad. He was working for Erinys International as a PMC.
 April 13, 2004 – Italian, Fabrizio Quattrocchi, was captured, along with three other Italians, and executed the next day. The other three Italians were rescued later that month. He was working as a PMC.
 April 22, 2004 – South African, Francois de Beer, was shot and killed in Baghdad. He was working for Meteoric Tactical Solutions as a PMC.
 April 25, 2004 – Two Americans, Thomas Carter and Vincent Foster, were killed by a roadside bomb near Baiji. They were working for Cochise Consultancy Inc. as PMC's.
 April 28, 2004 – Filipino, Rodrigo Reyes, was killed in an ambush in Abdali, near the Kuwait border. He was working for Kellogg, Brown & Root as a truck driver.
 April 29, 2004 – South African, name unknown, was shot and killed in Basra. He was working for a construction company as a PMC.
 April 30, 2004 – American, Mike Price, was killed by a roadside bomb near Baiji. He was working for Cochise Consultancy Inc. as a PMC. South African, name unknown, was killed by a land mine in Fallujah. He was working for a British security company as a PMC.
 May 1, 2004 – American, Christian F.Kilpatrick, was killed in an ambush near Tikrit. He was working for DynCorp International as a PMC. Turk, Cemal Ugar, was killed in an ambush near Baghdad. He was working as a truck driver.
 May 2, 2004 – Two Fijians, Kelepi Qaranivalu and Emori Vunibokoi, were killed in an ambush in Mosul. They were working for Global Risk Strategies Limited as PMC's.
 May 3, 2004 – American, Aban Elias, was captured in Baghdad, he is still missing and presumed dead. He was working as a civil engineer.
 May 7, 2004 – American, Daniel Parker, was killed by a roadside bomb in Baghdad. He was working for Kellogg, Brown & Root as a PMC. Poles, Waldemar Milewicz and Mounir Bouamrane were killed in an ambush in Latifiya. They were working as a journalist and cameraman for Polish National TV.
 May 10, 2004 – A New Zealander, John Robert Tyrrell, and a South African, William (Bill) John Richard, were killed in an ambush in Kirkuk. They were working for an Iraqi construction company as engineers.
 May 11, 2004 – Filipino, Raymundo Natividad, was killed in a mortar attack near Balad. He was working for Prime Projects International as a warehouseman. Russian, Alexei Konorev, was killed in an ambush in Musayyib, south of Baghdad. He was working for InterEnergoServis as a construction worker.
 May 12, 2004 – Two Turks, Suayip Kaplanli and the other name unknown, were killed in an ambush in Mosul. They were working for Yuksel Construction as construction workers.
 May 13, 2004 – Two Americans, Henry Doll and Jesse Gentry, were killed in a vehicle accident near Tikrit. They were working for DynCorp International as PMC's.
 May 14, 2004 – Briton, Brian Tilley, was killed in an ambush. He was working for an Egyptian communications project as a PMC.
 May 18, 2004 – Briton, Andrew Harries, was killed in an ambush between Mosul and Irbil. He was working for ArmourGroup as a PMC.
 May 24, 2004 – Two Britons, Mark Carman and Bob Morgan, were killed by a roadside bomb in Baghdad. Carman was working for Control Risks Group as a PMC, while Morgan was working for the British Foreign Office as a petroleum consultant.
 May 25, 2004 – Two Russians, Viktor Dynkin and Vyacheslav Ovsyannikov, were killed in an ambush south of Baghdad. They were working for InterEnergoServis as power plant technicians.
 May 30, 2004 – American, Bruce Tow, was killed in an ambush in Baghdad. He was working for DynCorp International as a PMC.
 June 2, 2004 – American, Richard Bruce, was killed in a vehicle accident. He was working for Blackwater Security as a PMC.
 June 5, 2004 – Two Americans, Jarrod Little and Chris Neidrich, and two Poles, Krzysztof Kaskos, Artur Zukowski, were killed in an ambush in Baghdad. They were working for Blackwater Security as PMC's. American, James Gregory Wingate, was killed by a roadside bomb near Haditha. He was working for Kellogg, Brown & Root as a truck driver. Briton, Craig Dickens, was killed in an ambush near Mosul. He was working for ArmourGroup as a PMC.
 June 11, 2004 – Lebanese, Hussein Ali Alyan, was captured and executed. He was working as a construction worker.
 June 13, 2004 – American, Shaun Fyfe, died of natural causes. He was working for Environmental Chemical Corp. International as a construction worker.
 June 14, 2004 – An American, Bill Hoke II, two Britons, Keith Butler and John Poole, a Frenchman, name unknown, and a Filipino, Raul Flores, were killed by a car bomb in Baghdad. The two Britons were working for Olive Security as PMC's, while the rest worked for Granite Services, Inc. as power industry workers. American, Rex G.Sprague III, was killed in an ambush in Baghdad. He worked for Titan National Security Solutions as a PMC.
 June 17, 2004 – American, Walter J.Zbryski, was killed by a roadside bomb. He was working for Kellogg, Brown & Root as a truck driver. Turk, Faysal Demir, was killed by friendly fire in Baghdad. He was working for a Turkish manufacturer of prefab housing as a truck driver.
 June 19, 2004 – Portuguese, Roberto Carlos, was killed by a roadside bomb south of Basra. He was working for Al-Atheer as a telecommunications worker.
 June 22, 2004 – Briton, Julian Davies, was killed in an ambush in Mosul. He was working for Global Risk Strategies Limited as a PMC. South Korean, Kim Sun-il, was captured and executed. He was working for Gana General Trading Co. as a supplier.
 June 27, 2004 – American, Joseph Arguelles, was killed when his transport plane was fired on over Baghdad. He worked for Readiness Mgmt. Svcs. as an electric power specialist.
 July 2, 2004 – American, Vern O'Neal Richerson, died at the U.S. military hospital in Landstuhl, Germany, of wounds he received in a mortar attack. He was working for Kellogg, Brown & Root as a construction foreman.
 July 9, 2004 – Two Turks, names unknown, were killed in an ambush near Samarra. They were working as truck drivers.
 July 12, 2004 – Turk, name unknown, was killed by a roadside bomb near Baiji. He worked as a truck driver.
 July 13, 2004 – Bulgarian, Georgi Lazov, was captured and executed in Mosul. He worked for a Bulgarian trucking company as a truck driver.
 July 17, 2004 – Jordanian, Ayid Nassir, was killed in an ambush in Ramadi. He worked as a truck driver. Turk, Abdulcelil Bayik, was killed in an ambush near Mosul. He worked as a truck driver.
 July 19, 2004 – American, Mike Copley, was killed in a mortar attack in Samarra. He was working for United Defense Industries as a Bradley fighting vehicle maintenance technician.
 July 20, 2004 – Russian, Anatoly Korenkov, died at a Moscow hospital of wounds he received in an ambush. He worked for InterEnergoServis as a power plant technician.
 July 22, 2004 – Bulgarian, Ivaylo Kepov, was captured and executed near Baiji. He was working for a Bulgarian trucking company as a truck driver.
 July 25, 2004 – Jordanian, Marwan Zuheir Al Rusan, was shot and killed in Mosul. He was a businessman.
 July 28, 2004 – Two Pakistanis, Raja Azad and Sajad Naeem, were captured and executed. They were working for Al Tamimi group as construction workers.
 August 1, 2004 – Turk, Murat Yuce, was captured and executed. He was working for Bilintur as a cleaner.
 August 2, 2004 – Turk, Ferit Nural, was killed in an ambush near Baghdad. He worked as a truck driver.
 August 4, 2004 – Turk, Osman Alisan, was killed in an ambush near Baghdad. He worked for Ulasli Oil Company as a truck driver.
 August 10, 2004 – Egyptian, Mohammed Abdel Aal, was captured and executed. He worked as a car mechanic.
 August 11, 2004 – American, Kevin Rader, was killed in an ambush. He was working for Kellogg, Brown & Root as a truck driver.
 August 12, 2004 – Indian, Eldho Abraham, was killed by a roadside bomb in Baghdad. He worked for a British construction company "Frame Project International" as an electrical engineer.
 August 16, 2004 – South African, Herman Pretorius, was killed in an ambush in Mosul. He was working for DynCorp International as a PMC.
 August 22, 2004 – Indonesian, Fahmi Ahmad, was killed in an ambush in Mosul. He was working for a subcontractor to Siemens as a telecommunications engineer. Turk, name unknown, was killed in an ambush between Tikrit & Kirkuk. He worked for a Tikrit bridge repair firm as a construction worker.
 August 23, 2004 – Three Macedonians: Dalibor Lazarevski, Dragan Markovikj and Zoran Naskovski, were captured and executed in Baghdad. They were working for Soufan Engineering as construction workers. Jordanian, Beshir Ahmed, was killed in a car hijacking between Tikrit & Baiji. He was a businessman.
 August 24, 2004 – American, Jamal Tewfik Salman, was captured and executed. He was working as a translator.
 August 27, 2004 – Egyptian, Jawdee Baker, was shot and killed in Baiji. He was working as a private contractor.
 August 30, 2004 – 12 Nepalese were captured and executed. Their names were: Prakash Adhikari, Ramesh Khadka, Lalan Singh Koiri, Mangal Bahadur Limbu, Jit Bahadur Thapa Magar, Gyanendra Shrestha, Rajendra Kumar Shrestha, Bodhan Kumar Sah Sudi, Manoj Kumar Thakur, Sanjay Kumar Thakur, Bhekh Bahadur Thapa and Bishnu Hari Thapa. They were working for Morning Star Co. as cooks and cleaners. Three Turks: Majid Mehmet al-Gilami, Yahya Sadr and one name unknown, were captured and executed near Samarra. They were working as truck drivers.
 September 4, 2004 – American, John N.Mallery, was killed in an ambush in Taji. He was returning to his home base in Baghdad after picking up a payment at Camp Anaconda, Balad, Iraq.  At the time of his death he was working for MayDay Supply as a project manager.  Egyptian, Nasser Salama, was captured and executed near Baiji. He was working as a private contractor.
 September 10, 2004 – American, William Earl Bowers, was killed in an ambush near Baghdad. He was working for SEI Group Inc. as an engineer.
 September 14, 2004 – Two Canadians, Andrew Shmakov and Munir Toma, were killed by a car bomb in Baghdad. They were working as private contractors. American, Todd Engstrom, was killed in an ambush near Balad. He was working for EOD Technology Inc. as a PMC.
 September 16, 2004 – Two Americans, Eugene Armstrong and Jack Hensley, and a Briton, Kenneth Bigley, were captured in Baghdad. Armstrong was executed on September 20, Hensley was executed the next day and Bigley was executed on October 7. They were working for Gulf Services Co. as engineers.
 September 21, 2004 – Turk, Akar Besir, was captured and executed. He was working as a truck driver.
 September 28, 2004 – American, Roger Moffett, was killed by a roadside bomb. He was working for Kellogg, Brown & Root as a truck driver.
 September 29, 2004 – Briton, Iain Hunter, was killed in a vehicle accident in Tikrit. He was working for ArmourGroup as a PMC.
 September 30, 2004 – Briton, Alan Wimpenny, was killed by a roadside bomb near Samarra. He was working as a PMC.
 October 4, 2004 – South African, Johann Hattingh, was killed and one other South African, Gavin Holtzhausen, was wounded by a suicide car-bomber on Sadoon Street, Baghdad. Holtzhausen later died of his injuries.
 October 11, 2004 – Two Britons, died in Kirkuk, one, Paul Chadwick, accidentally shot himself while the other, name unknown, was killed by a sniper. They were working for ArmourGroup as PMC's. Turk, Maher Kemal, was captured and executed. He was working as a truck driver.
 October 12, 2004 – Two South Africans, Johan Botha and Louis Campher, were killed in an ambush south of Baghdad. They were working for Omega Risk Solutions as PMC's.
 October 14, 2004 – Four Americans: Eric Miner, Steve Osborne, John Pinsonneault and Ferdinand Ibabao, were killed by a suicide bomber in Baghdad. They were working for DynCorp International as PMC's. Turk, Ramazan Elbu, was captured and executed. He was working as a truck driver.
 October 19, 2004 – American, Felipe E.Lugo III, was killed in a mortar attack near Baghdad. He was working for Kellogg, Brown & Root as a labor foreman.
 October 23, 2004 – Croat, Dalibor Burazović, was killed in an ambush near Mosul. He was working for Eurodelta d.o.o. as a truck driver. Turk, name unknown, was killed in an ambush in Baiji. He was working as a truck driver.
 October 27, 2004 – American, Travis Schnoor, was killed by a roadside bomb west of Baghdad. He was working for Custer Battle as a PMC.
 October 29, 2004 – Turk, name unknown, was killed in an ambush in Mosul. He was working as a truck driver.
 November 2, 2004 – American, Radim Sadeq Mohammed Sadeq, was captured in Baghdad, he is still missing and presumed dead. He was a businessman.
 November 3, 2004 – American, Jeffery Serrett, was killed in an attack on a prison in Baghdad. He was working for Kellogg, Brown & Root as a medic. Briton, John Barker, was killed by a suicide bomber in Baghdad. He was working for Global Risk Strategies Limited as a PMC.
 November 5, 2004 – Nepali, Tikaram Gurung, was killed in an ambush. He was working for Gorkha Manpower Company as a PMC.
 November 7, 2004 – Turk, name unknown, was killed in an ambush in Samarra. He was working as a truck driver.
 November 8–16, 2004 – A Briton and a Turk, names unknown, were killed during the battle of Mosul. The Briton was working as a PMC, while the Turk was working as a truck driver.
 November 9, 2004 – Two Americans, Aaron Iversen and David Randolph, were killed in an ambush between Baghdad and Fallujah. They were working for EOD Technology Inc. as PMC's.
 November 11, 2004 – American, Mike Tatar, was killed with friendly fire on the way to Baghdad from FOB Far ion Huggins. He was working for DynCorp International as a PMC.
 November 10, 2004 – American, Douglas S.Thomas, was killed by an IED while in a convoy from Balad en route to Tikrit. He was working for DynCorp International as a PMC.
 November 14, 2004 – American, Wolf Weis, was killed in an ambush near Mosul. He was working as a private contractor.
 November 7, 2004 – A Briton and a South African, Shaun Husband and Johan Terry, were killed by a roadside bomb in Zubayr, near Basra. They were working for Olive Security as PMC's.
 November 16, 2004 – South Korean, Jung Myeong-nam, was killed in an accident in Irbil. He was working for Taehwa Electric Co. as a private contractor.
 November, 2004 – South African, Jacques Oosthuize, was killed in an ambush on a road between Tikrit and Mosul. He was working for Erinys Iraq as a PMC.
 November 25, 2004 – Four Nepalis, names unknown, were killed by a mortar attack in Baghdad. They were working for Global Risk Strategies Limited as PMC's.
 November 30, 2004 – Honduran, José Mauricio Mena Puerto, was killed in an ambush. He was working for DynCorp International as a medic.
 December 8, 2004 – Two Americans, Dale Stoffel and Joseph Wemple, were shot and killed outside Baghdad. They were working for CLI USA as construction contractors.
 December 15, 2004 – Italian, Salvatore Santoro, was shot and killed at an insurgent checkpoint outside Ramadi. He was working as an aid worker.
 December 20, 2004 – Turk, Saban Ozsagir, was killed in an ambush near Mosul. He was working as a truck driver.
 December 21, 2004 – Four Americans: Leslie W. Davis, Brett A.Hunter, Allen Smith and Anthony M. Stramiello Jr., were killed by a suicide bomber in Mosul. They were working for Kellogg, Brown & Root as construction foremen and technicians.

2005 
 January 3, 2005 – Three Britons: John Dolman, Nick Pear, one not known and one American, Tracy Hushin, were killed by a suicide bomber in Baghdad. Dolman and Pears were working for Kroll Security International as PMC's, while the other two worked for BearingPoint Inc. as financial managers.
 January 16, 2005 – American, name unknown, was killed in an ambush north of Baghdad. He was working for Steele Foundation as a PMC. Egyptian, Ibrahim Mohammed Ismail, was found dead, his body dumped in a street, in Ramadi. He was working as a truck driver.
 January 19, 2005 – Briton, Andrew Whyte, was killed in an ambush south of Baiji. He was working for Janusian Security Risk Mgmt. as a PMC.
 February 8, 2005 – Croat, Ivan Pavčević, was killed in an ambush near Tikrit. He was working as a truck driver.
 March 3, 2005 – Two Americans, Jimmy A.Riddle and Brian J.Wagoner, were killed by a roadside bomb in Ashraf. They were working for Special Operations Consulting-Security Mgmt. Group Inc. as PMC's.
 March 12, 2005 – Two Americans, Jim Cantrell and Bruce Durr, were killed by a roadside bomb in Hilla. They were working for Blackwater Security as PMC's. A Turk, name unknown, was killed by a roadside bomb near Baiji. He was working as a truck driver.
 March 20, 2005 – Turk, name unknown, was killed in an ambush north of Baiji. He was working as a truck driver.
 March 25, 2005 – American, Eugene Hyatt, was killed in an accident. He was working for Kellogg, Brown & Root as a carpenter foreman.
 April 1, 2005 – American, Alfred Habelman, was killed in an ambush. He was working for a California-based construction company as a PMC.
 April 11, 2005 – Turk, name unknown, was killed by a roadside bomb in Baiji. He was working as a truck driver.
 April 16, 2005 – Turk, name unknown, was killed by a roadside bomb south of Mosul. He was working as a truck driver.
 April 18, 2005 – Filipino, Rey Torres, was killed in an ambush in Baghdad. He was working for Qatar International Trading Company as a PMC.
 April 20, 2005 – An American, an Australian and a Canadian: James Hunt, Chris Ahmelman and Stefan Surette, were killed in ambush in Baghdad. They were working for Edinburgh Risk Inc. as PMC's. Turk, name unknown, was killed by a roadside bomb in Baghdad. He was working as a truck driver.
 April 21, 2005 – Six Americans, three Bulgarians and two Fijians were killed when their Mi-8 transport helicopter was shot down near Tarmiya, north of Baghdad. Their names were: Robert Jason Gore, Stephen Matthew McGovern, Jason Obert, David Patterson, Luke Adam Petrik, Eric Smith, Stoyan Anchev, Lyubomir Kostov, Georgi Naydenov, Jim Atalifo and Timoci Lalaqila. The Bulgarians were working as helicopter pilots, while the rest were working for Blackwater Security as PMC's. American, Curtis Hundley, was killed by a roadside bomb near Ramadi. He was working for Blackwater Security as a PMC. Briton, Alan Parkin, was killed by a suicide bomber in Baghdad. He was working for Aegis Defence Services as a PMC.
 May 1, 2005 – Turk, name unknown, was killed in an ambush north of Baghdad. He was working as a truck driver.
 May 3, 2005 – Turk, Salih Gulbol, was killed in an ambush near Baghdad. He was working for a Kuwaiti company "Eskiocaklar" as a truck driver.
 May 7, 2005 – Two Americans, Brandon Thomas and Todd Venette, were killed by a car bomb in Baghdad. They were working for CTU Consulting as PMC's.
 May 9, 2005 – Four South Africans, names unknown, and one Japanese, Akihiko Saito, were killed when their convoy was ambushed and decimated near Hit. Saito was initially wounded and allegedly captured but died later of his wounds. They were working for Hart Security Company as PMC's under contract to PWC Logitsics at the Abu Ghraib Warehouse Distribution Center near Baghdad International Airport.
 May 10, 2005 – American, Thomas W.Jaichner, was killed by a sniper in Ramadi. He was working for Blackwater Security as a PMC.
 May 12, 2005 – American, Reuben Ray Miller, was killed by a roadside bomb. He was working for Kellogg, Brown & Root as a truck driver.
 May 22, 2005 – Jordanian, Al-Sanie, was killed in an ambush. He was working as a truck driver.
 May 28, 2005 – Lebanese, name unknown, was killed in a drive-by shooting in Baghdad. He was working as an interpreter.
 June 2, 2005 – Turk, Salih Gulbol, was killed in an ambush in Baiji. He was working as a truck driver.
 June 7, 2005 – South African, Séan Ronald Laver, was killed by a roadside bomb in Habbaniya. He was working for Hart Security Companyas as a PMC.
 June 9, 2005 – Turk, Yusuf Akar, was killed in an ambush in Ramadi. He was working as a truck driver.
 June 15, 2005 – Bosnian, Ljubiša Aleksić, was killed in an ambush 60 kilometres south of Baghdad. He was working for Lloyd-Owen International as a PMC.
 June 21, 2005 – Turk, name unknown, was killed in an ambush east of Balad. He was working as a truck driver.
 June 27, 2005 – American, Deborah Dawn Klecker, was killed by a roadside bomb east of Baghdad. She was working for DynCorp International as a PMC.
 July 1, 2005 – Turk, name unknown, was killed in an ambush near Baiji. He was working as a truck driver.
 September 2, 2005- American Leon "Vince" Kimbrell was killed by a shaped charge IED near the Al-Sadeer Compound in Baghdad. He worked for Dyncorp.
 September 3, 2005 – American, Ron Wiebe (US Navy Retired RVN Vet), and Briton, Jim Martin, were killed on their way back from Tikrit to Baghdad.
 September 20, 2005 – Four Americans: Keven Dagit, Sascha Grenner-Case, Christopher Lem and one name unknown, were killed when they were ambushed and massacred in Duluiya, their bodies were mutilated. They were working for Kellogg, Brown & Root as truck drivers.
 November 12, 2005 – Sudanese, name unknown, was killed in an attack on the Omani embassy in Baghdad. He was working as a private contractor.
 November 14, 2005 – Two South Africans, Naas Du Preez and Johannes Potgieter, were killed by a roadside bomb on Haifa Street, Baghdad.
 November 17, 2005 – South African, "Tabs" from 23 Battalion, died as a result of wounds he sustained from a roadside bomb on November 14, on Haifa Street, Baghdad.
 December 22, 2005 – An American and a South African, Kyle Kaszynski and Jan Strauss, were killed by a roadside bomb north of Baghdad. Kaszynski was working for Croll Management while Strauss was working for DynCorp International. They were both PMC's.

2006 
 January 5, 2006 – Indian, Sibi Kora, was killed by a roadside bomb. He was working as a truck driver
 March 6, 2006 – South African, Morne Pieterse, was killed by a roadside bomb in Basra.
 May 7, 2006 – British, Karl Saville was killed in Baghdad. He was working for "Danubia Global" as security contractor.
 May, 2006 – South African, Richard Andrew Kolver, was killed by a roadside bomb in Baghdad
 June 8, 2006 – Australian Wayne Schulz was killed when the armoured vehicle in which he was travelling was destroyed by an explosive device. He was working for ArmorGroup.
 June 11, 2006 Briton Kenneth Clarke killed in Tikrit by a roadside bomb
 June 14, 2006 – A Swedish security contractor was killed by an explosive device. He was working for "Genric Ltd.".
 July 15, 2006 – Syrian, Salih Fawzi al-Madani, was captured in Baghdad, his body was found mutilated at the beginning of August. He was working as a private contractor.
 August 19, 2006 – South African, Edmund Bruwer, was killed by a roadside bomb.
 September 17, 2006 – American, Darrell Leroy Wetherbee, was killed by a sniper in Hawijah. He was working for DynCorp as a PMC.
 October 2, 2006 – Two Turks, Nuri Akceren and Zeki Kilicwho, were killed in an ambush near Mosul. They were working as truck drivers.
 October 30, 2006 – South African, Morne Pieters, killed by hostile fire.

2007 
 January 7, 2007 – American, Glenda Oliver Butts, died of natural causes. She was working for Two Rivers Consultants as a construction consultant.
 January 9, 2007 – 2007 Balad aircraft crash, 5 pilots – citizens of Moldavia and 28 Turkish construction workers were killed
 January 17, 2007 – Croatian Željko Both was killed in an ambush in Baghdad. He was working for "Unity Resources Group" as security contractor. Also, Hungarian, Janos Nemeth, killed same contact.
 January 23, 2007 – Five Americans: Steve Gernet, Ron Johnson, Art Laguna, Shane Stanfield and Casey Casavant, were killed by insurgents during the rescue of US dignitaries from an ambushed meeting in Eastern Baghdad. They worked for Blackwater and were contracted Dept. of State PMC's.
 February, 2007 – U.S. citizen Donald E. Tolfree Jr. was killed at Camp Anaconda. He was worked for KBR, Inc. as truck driver
 February 15, South African, Glen Joyce, was killed by an IED in Baghdad.
 February 18, Don Schneider an American civilian driving a post office mail truck from Kuwait to Camp Ceder Iraq died from two 155 round IED's
 March 2007 – U.S. citizen Carolyn Edwards was killed in Baghdad's Green Zone. She was worked for KBR, Inc. as logistics coordinator
 April 5, 2007 – Kuwaiti, name unknown, was killed in an ambush in Basra. He was working as a translator.
 April 15, 2007 – Five Iranians, names unknown, were killed in an ambush in Baqubah. They were working as truck drivers.
 June 12, 2007 – American, Michael Wayne Butler, was killed by a rocket propelled grenade in Tikrit. He worked for DynCorp International as a PMC.
 July 15, 2007 – Australians Brendan Hurst and Justin Saint were killed by a rocket propelled grenade in an ambush. They were working for BLP International.
 August 28, 2007 – South African, Frans Robert Brand, was killed by an IED. He was employed as a security specialist by the London-based ArmorGroup Iraq.
 October 10, 2007 – U.S. Citizens Michael Doheny; Micah Shaw; Steve Evrard, killed by E.F.P near Al Kut. They was worked as a PSC for SOC-LLC U.S. Private Security Company.

2008 
 February 18, 2008 - Mr M. Salih, Mr S. Chalil, Mr S. R. Arachchige, killed during a rocket attack on the COB, Basra Airport
 March 16, 2008 - Briton, Liam Carmichael, was killed when he was thrown from his vehicle after a tyre blow out in Sulaymaniyah, Iraq.
 June 12, 2008 – Briton, Darryl Fern, was killed by a roadside bomb. He was working for AEGIS as a PMC.
 June 13, 2008 – South African Desmond Milnes died from wounds sustained in the same attack as Darryl Fern.
 July 6, 2008- American Justin English was killed when his convoy struck an IED. He was a firefighter for WSI.
 November 13, 2008 – three Russians, two Ukrainians, one Belarusian, names unknown, and one Indian, Jaychandran Appukutten, were killed when their AN12 transport plane crashed near Fallujah. They were working for Falcon Aviation Group as cargo plane operators.

2009 
 March 4, 2009 – American, Justin Pope, died of an accidental gunshot wound. He was working for DynCorp International as a PMC
 March 9, 2009 – Pakistani, name unknown, was killed by Katyusha rocket fire in Basra. He was working as a private contractor at Basra International Airport.
 March 26, 2009 – Hungarian, Tibor Bogdan was killed by U.S. soldier near Camp Taji, north of Baghdad
 May 15, 2009 – Briton, name unknown, was killed by a roadside bomb in Hilla. He was working as a PMC.
 May 22, 2009 – American, Jim Kitterman, was stabbed and killed by fellow contractors in the Green Zone in Baghdad. He was working for Janus Construction as an engineer. Larry Eugene Young, was killed in a mortar attack on the Green Zone in Baghdad. He was working for Corporate Training Unlimited as a PMC.
 May 25, 2009 – American, Kenneth Rose was killed by a roadside bomb in Fallujah. He was working as a private contractor.
 May 25, 2009 – Two Americans, Terrance "Terry" Barnich and Dr. Maged Hussein, were killed by an IED outside Fallujah. They were working for the Iraq Transition Assistance Office.
 June 20, 2009 – The bodies of two Britons, Jason Creswell and Jason Swindlehurst, were recovered in Baghdad, they were captured on May 27, 2007. They were working for GardaWorld as PMC's.
 July 17, 2009 – Two Americans, William F. Hinchman and one name unknown, were killed when their helicopter crashed in Baghdad. They were working for Blackwater Security as PMC's.
 July 29, 2009 – The bodies of two Britons, Alec MacLachlan and Alan McMenemy, were recovered in Baghdad, they were captured on May 27, 2007. They were working for GardaWorld as PMC's.
 August 9, 2009 – An Australian and a Briton, Darren Hoare and Paul McGuigan, were killed by a fellow contractor in the Green Zone in Baghdad. They were working for ArmourGroup as PMC's.
 September 1, 2009 – American, Adam Hermanson, was electrocuted in Baghdad. He was working for Triple Canopy as a PMC.
 September 13, 2009 – American, Lucas "Trent" Vinson, was killed by a U.S. soldier at Contingency Operating Base Speicher in Tikrit. He was working for Kellogg, Brown & Root as a private contractor.

2010 
 March 10 – Briton, Robbie Napier, an Aegis Security contractor, died after the IED explosion in Iraq
 May 19 – Briton, Nic Crouch was killed by a suicide car bomber in Mosul. Two other western contractors – believed to be Americans – and at least one Iraqi contractor were seriously injured in the attack. All the contractors worked for the British security company Aegis.
 July 22 – Two Ugandans and a Peruvian, names unknown, were working as PMC's who were guarding the U.S. Embassy in Baghdad when they were killed in a rocket attack on the Green Zone.
 September 14 – Briton, Karl Bowen, was killed in a car accident near Kirkuk.
 October 4 – An American contractor, Michael Behr, passed away.

2011 
 March 16 – American, Johnnie Lee Smith died in Germany from injuries he received in Iraq when the truck he was driving hit an area covered in oil that had been ignited. He received burn injuries while trying to escape his vehicle. He was KBR truck driver
 June 23 – American, Stephen Everhart, was killed when his convoy was ambushed in Baghdad. He was working for USAID as an "international development and finance expert".

References

External links 
 Iraq Coalition Casualties: Contractors – A Partial List

Iraq War casualties
Private military contractors